Fc fragment of IgE, high affinity I, receptor for; gamma polypeptide is a protein that in humans is encoded by the FCER1G gene.

Function 

The high affinity IgE receptor, FcεRI, is a key molecule involved in allergic reactions. It is a tetramer composed of 1 alpha, 1 beta, and 2 gamma chains. The gamma chains are also subunits of other Fc receptors. [provided by RefSeq, Jul 2008].

References

Further reading 

 
 
 
 
 
 
 
 
 

Genes on human chromosome 1